Jerome LaMarr Johnson (born September 21, 1935) is a retired four-star admiral of the United States Navy who commanded the U.S. Second Fleet, Joint Task Force 120, and NATO's Striking Fleet Atlantic from 1988 to 1990. He served as Vice Chief of Naval Operations from 1990 to 1992.

Johnson has endorsed the false  conspiracy theory that the 2020 presidential election was rigged to favor Joe Biden and claims that the United States "has taken a hard left turn toward Socialism and a Marxist form of tyrannical government."

Early life and career
A Texas native, Johnson graduated from Texas A&M University in 1956; he would become the third A&M graduate to reach 4-star rank.

He then entered the Naval Aviation Cadet Program and was commissioned and designated a Naval Aviator. He served on active duty for almost 38 years. His commands at sea included Attack Squadron Twenty-Seven (VA-27), the combat stores ship , the aircraft carrier , Carrier Group Four, the U.S. Second Fleet, and NATO's Striking Fleet Atlantic.

Johnson is a graduate of the Naval Postgraduate School in Monterey, California, and the National Intelligence University in Washington, D.C. The latter later awarded him an honorary doctorate.

His final assignment was as the Vice Chief of Naval Operations. Before his retirement from active service, he became the Navy's "Gray Eagle," the longest-serving Naval Aviator on active duty.

Post-military career
After his military career, Johnson served for a decade as the President and Chief Executive Officer of the Navy-Marine Corps Relief Society. Founded in 1904, the non-profit provides financial, educational, and other assistance to active-duty and retired sailors, Marines, and their eligible family members. During his tenure, the Society disbursed more than $670 million in interest-free loans, grants, and tuition assistance for naval service families. Johnson stepped down in June 2003.

From 2002 to 2004, he served as Chairman of the Board of the 385,000-member Military Officers Association of America (MOAA).

Johnson serves as Chairman of the Board of Directors for Smiths Detection Inc., and Smiths Interconnect Inc; Vice President and Board of Directors for Wärtsilä Defense Inc; Trustee for the National Museum of Naval Aviation at Naval Air Station Pensacola, Florida; and the Board of Advisors for the Jewish Institute for National Security Affairs.

Personal life
Johnson was married to Joy Johnson for 59 years until her death in 2014. They have three adult children, five grandchildren, and five great-grandchildren. Johnson and his second wife, Marsha, reside in Fort Myers, Florida.

See also
Gray Eagle Award

Notes

External links

United States Navy admirals
1935 births
Living people
Texas A&M University alumni
Recipients of the Air Medal
Recipients of the Navy Distinguished Service Medal
Recipients of the Distinguished Flying Cross (United States)
Recipients of the Legion of Merit
Vice Chiefs of Naval Operations